Textfiles may refer to:
Text files, computer files of text
textfiles.com, an archive of text files